Verucchio is a comune in the province of Rimini, region of Emilia-Romagna, Italy.

History

Traces of a 12th-9th century BC settlement, supposed of Villanovan origin, have been found overlooking the Adriatic plain. Later it was an Etruscan possession. The current town derives its name from Vero Occhio ("True Eye"), referring to its privileged position offering a wide panorama of the surrounding countryside and the Romagna coast.

Malatesta da Verucchio, founder of the Malatesta lordship of Romagna, was born here. His successors fortified it as a powerful bastion against the Montefeltro of Urbino. After the expulsion of the Malatesta (15th century), it was a fief of the Medici in the Papal States; it remained part of the latter, with a short stint under the Republic of Venice, until 1620.

Demographic evolution

Main sights

Rocca Malatestiana  (Malatesta Castle, 12th-16th century; also known as Castel del Sasso, or "Castle of the Rock"). It is one of largest and better conserved Malatestian fortifications, and was the birthplace of Malatesta da Verucchio. In 1449 Sigismondo Pandolfo Malatesta enlarged it.
Archaeological Museum
Rocca del Passerello with the annexed gate.
Romanesque-Gothic Pieve, dating around 990.
Franciscan Convent (c. 1215), the most ancient in Romagna. Inside the church is a masterpiece of the 13th century Riminese painting school representing the crucifixion. Outside is a 700-year-old cypress that, according to the legend, was planted by St. Francis himself.

External links 
 
 Verucchio
 Verucchio

Cities and towns in Emilia-Romagna
Castles in Italy
Villanovan culture